A list of films produced in the United Kingdom in 1991 (see 1991 in film):

1991

See also
 1991 in film
 1990 in British music
 1990 in British radio
 1990 in British television
 1990 in the United Kingdom
 List of 1991 box office number-one films in the United Kingdom

External links

1991
Films
British